Richard Edward "Rich" Lambourne (born May 6, 1975) is an American indoor volleyball player. He joined the U.S. men's national team in 2000 as the designated libero. He has recently played for Delecta Bydgoszcz. Lambourne made his Olympic debut at the 2008 Olympics, helping Team USA to a gold medal.

High school and personal life

Lambourne was born in Louisville, Kentucky, to Paul and Ann Lambourne. He grew up in Tustin, California, and attended Foothill High School.

Lambourne was badly injured during a bike accident when he was 6. He skinned his shoulder to the bone and mangled the right side of his face. He says of the accident, "I could have been much uglier but due to my loving parents and medical science, I am only mostly unattractive".

He served a mission in Hokkaido, Japan, for the Church of Jesus Christ of Latter-day Saints.

College

Lambourne attended Brigham Young University where he majored in Japanese. He was also recruited by Stanford and Long Beach State.

In 1999, he was the starting outside hitter for the BYU men's volleyball team that won the program's first ever NCAA men's volleyball championship. For the year, he played in 82 games and posted 252 kills, 205 digs, 88 blocks and a .348 hitting percentage.

Career
Lambourne began to play professional volleyball for Lamia, a club from Greece. His next club was Aon hotVolleys Vienna. After that, he went to Noliko Maaseik, then to Polish Mlekpol AZS Olsztyn, then to the Russian Lokomotiv-Belogorie. He represented Polish Delecta Bydgoszcz. As of February 24, 2010 he has been disciplinary released.

Clubs
  Aon hotVolleys Vienna (2001–2003)
  Piet Zoomers Apeldoorn (2003–2004)
  Lamia (2004–2005)
  Noliko Maaseik (2005–2006)
  AZS Olsztyn (2006–2008)
  Lokomotiv-Belogorie (2008–2009)
  Delecta Bydgoszcz (2009–2010)
  Fart Kielce (2011–2012)
  Al Arabi S.C. (2012–2013)

International competitions

Recent international competition
2008
Olympic Games (gold medal)
FIVB World League (gold medal)
NORCECA Continental Olympic Qualifying Championship (gold medal)
2007
FIVB World Cup
NORCECA Continental Championship (gold medal)
America's Cup (gold medal)
FIVB World League (bronze medal)
2005
NORCECA Continental Championships (gold medal)
World Grand Champions Cup (silver medal)

Individual awards
2006 Pan-American Cup "Best Defender"
2007 FIVB World League "Best Libero"
2008 FIVB World League "Best Libero"

External links
 
 
 BYU Cougar Bio

1975 births
Living people
American men's volleyball players
AZS Olsztyn players
Sportspeople from Louisville, Kentucky
Sportspeople from Orange County, California
BYU Cougars men's volleyball players
Olympic gold medalists for the United States in volleyball
Volleyball players at the 2008 Summer Olympics
Latter Day Saints from California
Latter Day Saints from Kentucky
American Mormon missionaries in Japan
Volleyball players at the 2007 Pan American Games
American expatriate sportspeople in Poland
Expatriate volleyball players in Poland
Volleyball players at the 2012 Summer Olympics
Medalists at the 2008 Summer Olympics
Pan American Games silver medalists for the United States
Pan American Games medalists in volleyball
Medalists at the 2007 Pan American Games
Liberos